Acta Mathematicae Applicatae Sinica (English series) is a peer-reviewed mathematics journal published quarterly by Springer.
Established in 1984 by the Chinese Mathematical Society, the journal publishes articles on applied mathematics.
According to the Journal Citation Reports, the journal had a 2020 impact factor of 1.102.

References

External links

Mathematics journals
Publications established in 1984
English-language journals
Springer Science+Business Media academic journals
Quarterly journals